Irina Permitina (born February 3, 1968) is a Russian long distance runner, who won the bronze medal in the marathon at the 2006 European Athletics Championships in Gothenburg.  She is the women's course record holder for the Twin Cities Marathon in Minneapolis and St. Paul, Minnesota, along with fellow Russian Zinaida Semenova, who ran the same time (but three-tenths of a second slower) in 2001.

Half-Marathon World Champion (Masters)
Permitina held the record for fastest half-marathon run by a woman over 40 years old. She claimed the title while kicking to finish just seconds behind a younger Olesya Syreva at the Russian Half-Marathon Championship in 2008 in Novosibirsk. (In 2013, Syreva would have all her results to 2011 removed due to doping.) Permitina's record time was 1:09:56. She held the title until Deena Kastor broke it in 2008.

Achievements

See also
List of European Athletics Championships medalists (women)

References

External links

1968 births
Living people
Russian female long-distance runners
Russian female marathon runners
World Athletics Championships athletes for Russia
European Athletics Championships medalists
Russian Athletics Championships winners
20th-century Russian women
21st-century Russian women